Bubaqra Tower, formerly named as Saliba Tower, is a fortified house in Bubaqra, limits of Żurrieq, Malta. It was built as a country retreat in the late 16th century. The tower and its gardens have been restored, and now serve as a family retreat. It is officially named as Bubaqra Palace (Maltese: Palazz Bubaqra) and it is a grade 2 national monument.

History
Bubaqra Tower was built in around 1579 by Don Matteolo Pisani, a Conventual Chaplain of the Order of St. John. Fr. Luret Zammit confirms that it was built by Fr. Mattew (Matteolo) Pisani. Zammit says that it was eventually named Torre del Greco for a Greek family, the Roncali family, who lived there.

Although the structure was fortified, it was privately owned and was not meant for defensive purposes. Despite this, at some point it was probably used in Malta's defence system, as was done in other cases such as Gauci and Mamo Towers.

The structure was modified in the 18th century, during the rule of Grand Master Marc'Antonio Zondadari and around 1760, when four turrets were also added giving it a fortified residence appearance from the distance.

It was reportedly used as an illicit meeting place between members of the Order, who were bound by vows of celibacy, and young females. During this period, it was common for the knights, priests and bishops to have mistresses, illegitimate children, or both; notably, the parish priest of the village of Żurrieq himself was known to organise meetings against payment between young mistresses and their knightly suitors in the whereabouts of the tower.

The tower was requisitioned by the British military during World War II between 1939 and 1945, but was returned to its owners after the war. Thereafter, Bubaqra Tower and its gardens were restored, and the place was turned into a family retreat. The tower is listed on the National Inventory of the Cultural Property of the Maltese Islands. The building is officially known as Palazzo Bubaqra by the Malta Environment and Planning Authority (MEPA) and is scheduled as a grade 2 property.

Architecture
Bubaqra Tower is situated in an agricultural estate, in Bubaqra where it is surrounded by citrus gardens. It is square in shape, and has four distinctive corner turrets. Its architecture probably influenced the design of the Gourgion Tower, which was built in the late 17th century on Gozo. Above the main entrance of the building is an inscription that calls upon God to give relief from the enemy at the recitation of the sign of the cross.

Further reading

References

Fortified towers in Malta
Fortified houses in Malta
Żurrieq
Houses completed in 1579
Limestone buildings in Malta
National Inventory of the Cultural Property of the Maltese Islands
Palaces in Malta
16th-century fortifications